Heart on Fire may refer to:

"Heart on Fire" (Ruslana song)
"Heart on Fire" (Indiana song)
"Heart on Fire" (Clean Bandit song)
"Heart on Fire" (Eric Church song)

See also
 Hearts on Fire (disambiguation)